Humble High School (HHS) is a secondary school in the Humble Independent School District in Humble, Texas, United States. It serves grades 9 through 12 for the city of Humble, the Moonshine Hill area of Houston, and unincorporated communities north of Beltway 8. The campus serves the entire Humble area and the western part of Atascocita. In 2016, a portion of the upstairs main building was refurbished for the rezoning of Quest Early College High School (QECHS) completely independent from HHS.

History
Before 1918, students attended a single building, the Humble School, which housed grades 1-11. The first high school graduates in Humble graduated from this school in 1911.

The first school building, Humble High School, opened in 1918 on Higgins Avenue. In 1929, it was relocated to a new building, next door, as Charles Bender High School.

It became Humble High School again and moved to its present location at 1700 Wilson Road, in 1965. The original Charles Bender High School building still stands on Higgins Avenue. The original 1918 Humble High School building was demolished in 1955.

Until 2007, ninth grade students attended the Humble Ninth Grade Campus, adjacent to the Humble High campus at 1131 Wilson Road. That building was refurbished into Ross Sterling Middle School in 2007, and the ninth graders moved into the newly completed freshman annex at the high school.

Student enrollment

Before the opening of Atascocita High School in 2006, HHS had a population of over 5,000 students. Clearly overcrowded, AHS was opened to meet the large population growth in the Atascocita area. Continued growth in the southern portion of the district led to the opening of Summer Creek High School in 2009. This caused Humble to be reclassified as a 4A school by the UIL in 2010 with a fall 2010 enrollment of 1,651 students.

2007 Renovation

After the opening of AHS, Humble High School underwent a major makeover in 2007. The school was reformatted with six houses (similar to format used by AHS) to give students more personalized attention. Renovations also allowed HHS to comply with the Texas Education Agency's standards for class size. Bond funds paid for a new two-story classroom wing to replace the 40-year-old classroom wing. The school gained 15 science classrooms, three teaching theaters, seven business labs, practice areas for dance and drill team, and a new black box theater. Throughout the school, there is new carpet and paint. New electrical, plumbing and air-conditioning systems were installed.

2021-2022 Renovation 

On 30 October 2020, a groundbreaking ceremony took place for a major renovation to the school. The renovations at HHS include a modern cafeteria, library, performing arts theatre, a Career and Technical Education wing and athletics wing. The final point will see the creation of a competition and auxiliary gym. It is planned to be completed by August 2022 and will increase the campus size by just over 63,000 square feet to nearly 552,000 total square feet.

Principals 
The following persons have served as Principal of Humble High School.

Academics
For the 2018–2019 school year, the school received a C grade from the Texas Education Agency, with an overall score of 79 out of 100. The school received a B grade in two domains, Student Achievement (score of 81) and School Progress (score of 82), and a C grade in Closing the Gaps (score of 73). The school did not receive any of the seven possible distinction designations.

Languages
Humble High School offers language courses including Spanish, French, and American Sign Language. Although German and Latin were offered in the past, after a decrease in interest, the course was removed from the curriculum. Spanish and French are offered at the IB level, with AP courses being taught in Spanish and French as well.

Special programs

International Baccalaureate
The International Baccalaureate program was introduced to Humble High in the beginning of the 2007-2008 year, after interviewing applicants a year earlier. The 2009 class was the first IB students to graduate from Humble High School with an IB diploma. Although IB Music Theory was offered in the past the course was eventually removed from the curriculum in the 2017-2018 year.

T-STEM Academy
The HHS T-STEM Academy was introduced to the school during the 2016-2017 year following its designation by the Texas Education Agency earlier that year, with 50 students initially and adding 50 more each school year. The academy combines college preparatory curriculum with STEM themes. At most, the academy will serve a maximum of 400 high school students. The goal of the academy is to provide a college-style curriculum while readying students to pursue pathways in the STEM fields. The required degree plan will include 15-45 credit hours at no charge provided by the local Lone Star College in Kingwood.

Other programs
Besides IB, the school offers AVID, a program designed to aid and prepare economically disadvantaged and academically top-generation honors students from middle to high school into college. Humble High is also the only high school in Humble ISD to offer a cosmetology course.

Activities
The HHS supports 19 main extracurricular activities on its campus.

Academic Team
Army JROTC 
Band (including the Wildcat Marching Band)
Choir
Color Guard
Campus Crusade for Christ
Debate
National FFA Organization
Key Club
National Art Honor Society
National Honor Society
Orchestra
Spanish Club
Student Council
The Pride Newspaper
Theatre
WildCatdets
Yearbook

JROTC 
The JROTC program was introduced in 2002 and is currently the seniormost JROTC unit in Humble ISD as well as one of two United States Army programs in the district. Every Veterans Day since 2007, the program hosts the Wildcat Salute to Veterans ceremony in the school's commons area, in which cadets from the program guard a replica of the Tomb of the Unknown Soldier in Arlington National Cemetery. During the 2016 ceremony, state representative Dan Huberty the unit with the Flag of Texas that was flown over the state capital in honor of the holiday. As of 2019, the makeshift tomb is guard throughout the entirety of the school day. Outside of the ROTC program, a members of the band performs Taps while the floral program create the wreath that will be laid. Since 2013, the program has provided flag holders at the annual Humble Police Memorial Ceremony in May at the Humble Civic Center. In June 2019, the JROTC Academic Team took part in the JROTC Leadership and Academic Bowl (JLAB) in Washington D.C., where it competed against other JROTC units around the world.

Choir 
Years of Regional UIL Choral & Sight-Reading Sweepstakes

 2005 Treble Chorus^* (B)
 2006 Mixed Chorus* (A)
 2006 Treble Chorus^ (B)
2018 Treble Chorus^ (C)

^Denoting Sub-Varsity

*Denoting Varsity

Band

Marching 
Years of Regional UIL Marching Sweepstakes

(note: records before 2004 not available)

 2004 (region 19)
 2005 (region 19)
 2006 (region 19)
 2017* (region 33)
 2018* (region 33)
 2019 (region 33)
 2021* (region 33)
*Denoting Advancement to the Area Marching Band Contest

Concert & Sight-Reading 
Years of Regional UIL Concert & Sight-Reading Sweepstakes

 2005* (A)
 2006* (A)
 2007* (RMA)
2010^ (1)
 2011* (B)
 2015* (B)
 2021*^ 
^Denoting Symphonic

*Denoting Wind Symphony

State Solo & Ensemble Contest 
note: records before 2017 are not available

 2017 Clarinet Ensemble
2017 Brass Quartet
2018 Trumpet Solo

 2018 Brass Quintet
2019 Clarinet Trio
2019 Clarinet Trio
2019 Flute Quartet
2019 Saxophone Quartet
2019 Misc. Woodwind Ensemble
2019 Trumpet Solo
2019 Four Brass

Orchestra 
Years of Regional UIL String Orchestra Sweepstakes

 2011*
2013^
2015^
2018^*

^Denoting Symphonic

*Denoting Chamber

State Solo & Ensemble Contest 
note: records before 2017 are not available

 2018 Violin Solo (1)
 2018 String Quartet (1)
 2018 String Quartet (1)

Alumni

Alumni association
In 1932, there began to be celebrations of school alumni. Ever since then, there have been annual reunions of school alumni. Since 1997, the alumni association has given out scholarships sponsored by its own. In 2020, for the first time, the annual reunion was cancelled.

Notable alumni

 Jackie Battle, running back for the Dallas Cowboys, Kansas City Chiefs; and Tennessee Titans
 Bertrand Berry, former defensive end for Arizona Cardinals
 David Boston, Ohio State Buckeye star and former pro-bowler and NFL wide-receiver
 Kimberly Holland, Playboy Playmate
 David Kersh, country music singer
 A.J. Morris, Major League pitcher, currently with the Cincinnati Reds
 Joel Osteen, author and pastor
 Russell Tipton, Senior Associate Director of the Fightin’ Texas Aggie Band

Feeder patterns

Elementary schools that feed into Humble High School include:
 Jack Fields
 Humble
 Lakeland
 North Belt
 River Pines
 Park Lakes
 Whispering Pines

Middle schools that feed into Humble High School include:
 Humble Middle School
 Ross Sterling Middle School

References

External links
 Humble High School

Humble Independent School District high schools